The Real Thing is the third studio album by American rock band Faith No More, released on June 20, 1989 by Slash and Reprise Records. It was the first album by the band not to feature vocalist Chuck Mosley, instead, the album featured Mike Patton from the experimental/funk band Mr. Bungle. On this album, Faith No More continued to advance their sound range, combining funk metal, rap metal and alternative rock.

Background
Faith No More underwent several line-up changes before releasing their first album, We Care a Lot, released in 1985 and distributed through San Francisco-based label Mordam Records. On the original vinyl release, the band is credited as "Faith. No More" on the album's liner notes, back cover, and on the record itself. Within a year the band signed up with Slash Records. The debut album's title track "We Care a Lot" was later re-recorded, for their follow-up album Introduce Yourself in 1987, and released as their first single. Membership remained stable until vocalist Chuck Mosley was replaced by Mike Patton in 1988.

Production
The writing for the majority of the music for The Real Thing took place after the tour for Introduce Yourself. A demo version of "The Morning After", under the moniker "New Improved Song", with alternate lyrics written and sung by Chuck Mosley was released on the Sounds·Waves 2 extended play with the Sounds magazine. "Surprise! You're Dead!" was composed by Jim Martin in the 1970s, while he was guitarist for Agents of Misfortune; Agents of Misfortune also featured Cliff Burton in their line up. The recording of the song took place in December 1988 after Chuck Mosley was fired from the band, and was completed prior to the hiring of Mike Patton, who then wrote all the lyrics for the songs, and recorded them the following month over the music.

Producer Matt Wallace said:
All the music was written before Mike joined the band, which had gotten rid of the original singer, Chuck Mosley, and the tracks were either in preproduction or being recorded when Mike came in. And when he'd ask if he could make a section longer or different, the band would say "No, this is it, so you have to do it this way". So Mike Patton wrote every lyric and melody to that record over a ten to twelve day period. And it is stunning, because he was nineteen or twenty, and pulled all that out of the air, and put together an incredible record. The only thing we did was spend a couple of days at this coffee shop in San Francisco, because a lot of the songs were really dark and heavy lyrically, crazily so, and I would sit there and go, "Mike, these are some great lyrics, but we need to at least use some metaphor, or couch some of the concepts, but I think you've got some great ideas here". In the end, they really pulled some great songs together.

The recording sessions yielded several songs that did not appear on the album. Two of them, "The Grade" and "The Cowboy Song", later appeared on the singles and on the UK edition of Live at the Brixton Academy. A third song, "Sweet Emotion", was later re-recorded with different lyrics as "The Perfect Crime" for the soundtrack to the film that also starred a cameo appearance from guitarist Jim Martin, Bill & Ted's Bogus Journey. The original version was released on Flexible Fiend 3 with Kerrang! magazine issue 258 and, more recently The Very Best Definitive Ultimate Greatest Hits Collection, the greatest hits compilation released to coincide with the band's reunion tour.

Controversy
After the release of the album, Faith No More developed somewhat of a rivalry with fellow Californian group Red Hot Chili Peppers, whom they had previously played with on The Uplift Mofo Party Tour. Singer Anthony Kiedis accused Mike Patton of stealing his "style" in the "Epic" music video. He told Kerrang! magazine "My drummer says he's gonna kidnap [Patton], shave his hair off and cut off one of his feet, just so he'll be forced to find a style of his own". In a separate interview, he clarified his comment, remarking "I love The Real Thing, and I liked his vocals on that record. I mean, when I heard the record I noticed subtle similarities, but when I saw that video it was like, 'Wait a second here, what the fuck?. Roddy Bottum responded by saying:
To me, our band sounds nothing like Red Hot Chili Peppers. If you're talking about long hair, rapping with his shirt off, then yeah, I can see similarities. But beyond that, I can't see any. I haven't talked to them since this whole thing started. We're really good friends with that band and I'd like to think they're doing it ... like as a favour".
Mike Patton finally addressed the allegations from Kiedis in 1990, commenting that "It just kind of came out of the blue. It doesn't bother me a bit. I got a real big kick out of it to tell you the truth. I mean, if he's gonna talk about me in interviews, that's fine - it's free press! Either he's feeling inadequate or old or I don't know, but I have no reason to talk shit about him." Later in 2001, Patton also theorized that "I think Anthony, deep down, feels like I'm a better dancer than he is. I think I shake my booty just a little bit fresher than he does. And if he would stop doing drugs I think he could outdance me. Maybe one day we'll have a breakoff, just breakdance."

Touring and support

Tours

The tour in support of The Real Thing was the first Faith No More tour conducted with Mike Patton. The band had begun to be marketed as metal by the media after the album's release, and they were now primarily playing with other bands from the heavy metal genre. Notable artists Faith No More performed with during the touring cycle include Metallica, Billy Idol, Soundgarden, Voivod, Sacred Reich, Forbidden, Primus, Babes in Toyland and Poison. They managed to attract controversy for mocking the party/sex-filled lifestyles of glam metal tourmates such as Poison at several shows in Europe during 1990. The second show of the tour was filmed for the music video to "From out of Nowhere" in the I-Beam nightclub. During the show, Patton had a beer bottle smashed over his right hand, causing lacerations to some tendons. He regained use of his hand after it healed, but he no longer has feeling in it. The band's August, 28 1990 concert at Burgherrenhalle in Kaiserslautern, Germany is notable for featuring the only ever performance of the song "Faster Disco" with Patton on vocals. The concert also featured several other Chuck Mosley-era songs which have almost never been performed live with Patton, including "Blood", "Greed" and "The Jungle". At that time, the band's first independent album We Care a Lot was not in circulation. "As the Worm Turns" and "Why Do You Bother" were the only songs from the album to be regularly worked into the band's setlists on the tour (aside from the title track, which was re-recorded for their major label debut Introduce Yourself). Regarding the decision to still perform material from We Care a Lot, Gould said to Metal Hammer in May 1990 that, "we'd feel weird cutting that part of ourselves off. We'd be ignoring a root of the tree, if you will."

Touring in support of the album lasted from 1989 to 1991. Due to their small catalog at the time, the band eventually grew tired of playing songs from The Real Thing towards the end of the tour. This has been cited as one of the reasons for the change in sound on their next album Angel Dust.

Singles
	

The first single to be released from the album was "From Out of Nowhere" on August 30, 1989 which failed to make the UK Singles Chart. It was re-released on April 2, 1990 and made number twenty-three on the UK Singles Chart. In between these releases was "Epic" on January 30, 1990, the music video for which received extensive airplay on MTV throughout the year, despite provoking anger from animal rights activists for a slow motion shot of a fish flopping out of water. "Falling to Pieces" then saw release on July 2, 1990 and made it to number 92 on the Billboard Hot 100 before the reissue of "Epic", which became the band's first number one hit single, on the ARIA Charts, as well their only top ten single on the Billboard Hot 100, where it reached ninth position.

"Surprise! You're Dead!" had a music video produced for it, directed by bassist Billy Gould, featuring footage shot in Chile during a South American tour in 1991. However, the song never saw release as an official single, and the video was not released until its appearance on Video Croissant. "Edge of the World" saw limited release as a two track promo single in Brazil on CD and 12" vinyl, with the album version as track one and the Brixton Academy live version as the second track, in a yellow slipcase with basic black text.

Critical reception

The Real Thing is one of Faith No More's most successful albums to date. It is now considered a classic metal album by fans and critics alike. Although released in mid-1989, The Real Thing did not enter the Billboard 200 until February 1990, after the release of the second single from the album, "Epic". The album eventually peaked at number eleven on the chart in October 1990, following the reissue of "Epic" almost a year and half after the initial release of the album. It was eventually certified platinum in U.S. and Canada as well as being certified Silver in the United Kingdom.

Jonathan Gold, for the Los Angeles Times, referred to Faith No More as "the kings of neo metal" in 1990, while The Real Thing had "been on the sales charts for eight months", writing:
Faith No More is a band with a punk-rock bassist, a classically trained keyboardist, a punk-funk singer and a drummer who would probably rather be playing Ghanaian tribal music, which goes a long way toward explaining the band's diversity. And, of course, there's heavy-metal Jim. Call what they do neo-metal.

The genre of The Real Thing has been variously described as having a predominant "funk-metal groove" by Chris Morris for Billboard magazine in 1992 and containing "funk, metal, traditional rock, instrumental, and even a little 'easy listening by Travis Lowell for Toxic Universe in 2001.

Tom Breihan wrote for Stereogum in 2012 that the album
gets a ton of credit and blame for helping to popularize rap-metal, but it was a lot more than that ... veered from quasi-Middle-Eastern orchestral churn ("Woodpecker From Mars") to dementedly creepy lounge-singer irony ("Edge Of The World") to all-out blitzkrieg ("Surprise! You're Dead"), but the whole thing felt cohesive because the band remained in a thunderous groove throughout and because they always tossed in triumphant hooks like the synth-line on "Falling To Pieces."

Following the 2015 remastered re-release of the album, several sources retrospectively reviewed it; Brandon Geist for Rolling Stone wrote that it was then "considered to be an alterna-metal classic", and Joseph Schafer for Stereogum ranked it as the second best Faith No More album, commenting that it was "more cohesive [and] lovable" than Angel Dust. They called it "sublime funk metal" and wrote that "the amount of diversity Faith No More crammed into 1989's The Real Thing seemed to be a middle finger to arena rock". Stuart Berman for Pitchfork wrote that it had a "reputation as an alt-rock trailblazer" and "connection to a long-past funk-metal zeitgeist" continuing to state that the album track "Epic" "was perfectly timed to satiate the then-burgeoning appetite for rap-rock".

Chris Conaton for PopMatters wrote in 2015 that the album "made a minor splash in the alternative metal community" and featured "a fascinating and entertaining smorgasbord of styles", and Ian Gittins wrote in their book The Periodic Table of Heavy Rock:when Mike Patton replaced [Chuck Mosley] ... FNM had all the standard hard-rock assault weapons of seizure-like rhythms, chugging guitar detonations and seismic drumming in their arsenal, but accessorized them with wildly eclectic influences from hip hop to synth pop and a brutally sarcastic sense of black humour.

Legacy
The Dillinger Escape Plan frontman Greg Puciato named The Real Thing one of the albums that changed his life and, on the month of the album's 30th anniversary, he wrote an article for Faith No More Followers about the impact that it had on him and alternative music. In 2015, Korn vocalist Jonathan Davis stated:
My favorite Faith No More record is The Real Thing. That's when Mike Patton took over. That's the one. [Although] I do like We Care a Lot. We got a lot of our influences from The Real Thing. It showed everybody you could do heavy music and not be "metal". It was something completely different.
In a January 1997 interview with Guitar World, Korn's guitarist Brian "Head" Welch listed it as an album that changed his life, recalling:
I was about 17 when I first heard it, and listening to a lot of Metallica, 24-7 Spyz, Living Colour and Fishbone. I dug them all, but Faith No More moved me in a different way, a way more than anything else. It totally changed my direction. It said to me that you didn't have to follow a certain path, that you could just create anything, go out and mess around with anything, that there were no rules. I remember seeing them open up for Metallica, and everyone started booing them going "Rap sucks!" I was so bummed. I felt like screaming at everyone, "Quit fucking booing them and listen." They all just heard the rap beat and didn't give them a chance. Then, six months later, they were all over MTV and the same fuckers who were booing were probably lining up to see them.
James "Munky" Shaffer, another of Korn's guitarists, also praised the album, recalling:
Fieldy and I were big Faith No More fans. In the late 80s they were playing a kind of funk rock; so were the Red Hot Chili Peppers, but we tended to lean more towards the minor progressions. When Patton joined in '89 they dropped a single called "From Out of Nowhere" and we were sold all the way. At that point we became real fanatics – started researching the guy and going up to San Francisco to see them play. Every song on this record was super inspiring to us. The song structures and Patton's sense of melody – it was alternative metal at its best.

"Epic" was ranked number thirty on VH1's 40 Greatest Metal Songs, and number sixty-seven on their 100 Greatest One-hit Wonders list.

Cover versions
 "From Out of Nowhere" has been covered by Canadian new wave/electronic rock band The Birthday Massacre on their compilation album Imagica, Finnish band Apocalyptica on their second album, Inquisition Symphony, German power metal band Helloween covered the song on their cover album Metal Jukebox and the Danish metal band, Raunchy covered the song on their album Velvet Noise Extended. It has also been covered by the band Five Finger Death Punch, and is featured on the UK version of their album The Way of the Fist as well as the soundtrack for The Avengers.
 "The Real Thing" was covered by American progressive metal band Redemption on the album The Fullness of Time as a bonus track.
 "Epic" has been covered both in concerts and on the Kerrang! Higher Voltage CD, a compilation of artists covering other songs. Such artists include the Welsh rock band The Automatic; the CD was released June 20, 2007. The metalcore band Atreyu also covered the song on their album Lead Sails Paper Anchor, and the Swedish indie band Love Is All covered it on their 2008 tour. In early 2023, The Lucid along with Violent J (Insane Clown Posse) re-imagined the song with re-written lyrics and vocal melodies retitling it "Sweet Toof".
 "Surprise! You're Dead!" has been covered by Jim Martin following his departure from the band, on his solo release Milk and Blood, and by Humans Being for the Tribute of the Year album. It was also covered by Belgian death metal band Aborted on their album Slaughter & Apparatus: A Methodical Overture, by American technical death metal band Revocation as a bonus track on their album Chaos of Forms, and by American deathcore band All Shall Perish as a bonus track on their album This Is Where It Ends.
 "Zombie Eaters" was covered by Ill Niño with Chino Moreno for their extended play The Under Cover Sessions.
 "Edge of the World" is covered twice on the Tribute of the Year album by both Hate Dept. and Combine Heathen.

Awards
The Real Thing was nominated for a Grammy Award for Best Metal Performance category in 1989 and "Epic" was nominated for a Grammy Award for Best Hard Rock Performance in 1991.

Accolades

Track listing

Personnel
 Mike Bordin – drums
 Roddy Bottum – keyboards
 Bill Gould – bass
 James Martin – guitars
 Mike Patton – vocals

Production
 Matt Wallace – producer, engineer
 Jim "Watts" Vereecke – assistant engineer
 Craig Doubet – assistant engineer
 John Golden – mastering
 Lendon Flanagon – photography
 Jeff Price – artwork
 Terry Robertson – CD design

Charts

Weekly charts

Year end charts

Certifications

References

Bibliography
 

1989 albums
Albums produced by Matt Wallace
Faith No More albums
Slash Records albums